Michel Matte (born 12 December 1949) is a Canadian politician. Matte was elected to represent the riding of Portneuf in the National Assembly of Quebec in the 2008 provincial election. He is a member of the Quebec Liberal Party.

Matte obtained a bachelor's degree in physical education from the Université du Québec à Trois-Rivières and a master's degree in arts from Laval University. He worked for 23 years at the Grand-Bois and Portneuf School Boards before being elected as mayor of Saint-Marc-des-Carrières in 1997. He was also the prefect for the Portneuf Regional County Municipality. He was also a member of the Union des municipalités du Québec.

External links
 
 Liberal Party biography 

Université Laval alumni
Living people
Quebec Liberal Party MNAs
Université du Québec à Trois-Rivières alumni
Mayors of places in Quebec
1949 births
21st-century Canadian politicians